Mupashi is an extinct monotypic genus of therocephalians that lived during the Late Permian of what is now Zambia. It was relatively small-bodied and had a long snout with a high tooth count compared to most other therocephalians. The size of its sclerotic ring suggests that it was adapted to be active in low-light conditions.

References 

Therocephalia genera
Monotypic prehistoric animal genera
Permian synapsids of Africa
Fossils of Zambia
Fossil taxa described in 2016